Captain William Stephen Sanders   (2 January 1871 – 6 February 1941) was a British Labour Party politician.

Sanders married Beatrice Martin, who later became a prominent suffragette.

Sanders unsuccessfully contested Portsmouth in 1906 and in January 1910. He was elected Member of Parliament (MP) for Battersea North at the 1929 general election and served as Financial Secretary to the War Office from 1930 to 1931, but lost his seat in 1931. He was re-elected for Battersea North at the 1935 general election, and held the seat until his resignation from the House of Commons in 1940 by accepting the post of Steward of the Manor of Northstead, a notional office-of-profit under the crown.

References

External links 

1871 births
1941 deaths
Labour Party (UK) MPs for English constituencies
UK MPs 1929–1931
UK MPs 1935–1945
Members of London County Council
Commanders of the Order of the British Empire
Members of the Fabian Society
General Secretaries of the Fabian Society